The 2023 Copa Colsanitas (branded as the 2023 Copa Colsanitas presentado por Zurich for sponsorship reasons) is an upcoming professional women's tennis tournament to be played on outdoor clay courts. It will be the 25th edition of the tournament and part of the 250 category of the 2023 WTA Tour. It will take place at the Country Club in Bogotá, Colombia, from 3 to 9 April 2023.

Champions

Singles

Doubles

Points and prize money

Point distribution

Prize money 

*per team

Singles main-draw entrants

Seeds 

1 Rankings as of 20 March 2023.

Other entrants 
The following players received wildcards into the main draw:
  María Herazo González
  Yuliana Lizarazo
  

The following players received entry from the qualifying draw:

Doubles main draw entrants

Seeds 

 Rankings are as of March 20, 2023.

Other entrants 
The following pair received a wildcard into the doubles main draw:
   /

References

External links 
 

Copa Colsanitas
Copa Colsanitas
Copa Colsanitas
Copa Colsanitas